The City municipality of Požarevac is one of two city municipalities which constitute the City of Požarevac. According to the 2011 census results, the municipality has 61,697 inhabitants.

Settlements
The City municipality of Požarevac includes the following settlements:

Bare
Batovac
Beranje
Bradarac
Bratinac
Brežane
Bubušinac
Burjan
Dragovac
Drmno
Dubravica
Živica
Kasidol
Kličevac
Lučica
Maljurevac
Nabrđe
Poljana
Požarevac
Prugovo
Rečica
Trnjane
Ćirikovac

See also
 Municipalities of Serbia

References

Municipalities of Požarevac